Fistulinella nivea is a bolete fungus in the family Boletaceae found in New Zealand. First described by mycologist Greta Stevenson in 1962 as a species of Tylopilus, it was transferred to the genus Fistulinella by Rolf Singer. Stevenson originally discovered the bolete in 1955 at Tōtaranui, where it was growing under Nothofagus. The pores on the cap underside are up to 1.5 mm in diameter. The pore surface is initially white before changing to pale pink. Spores are ellipsoid, hyaline (translucent), and measure 17–18 by 6–7 µm.

References

External links

Boletaceae
Fungi described in 1962
Fungi of New Zealand